Mundesley Volunteer Inshore Lifeboat is a voluntary run lifeboat station located in the village of Mundesley in the English county of Norfolk. The station operates one lifeboat which is used for inshore work. The lifeboat service is a "Declared Facility"; this means that H.M. Coastguard regard it as being on a par with the RNLI. The lifeboat provides its service 24 hours a day, 365 days a year to windsurfers, fishing boats, swimmers and divers or anybody in distress within the Mundesley area. The service has also provided assistance to boats of various sizes which have required towing etc.

History
The Parish Council of Mundesley became very concerned after a tragedy occurred half a mile off the beach in Mundesley in 1971. The incident resulted in the drowning and near drowning of a man and his wife whilst sailing their boat. A meeting was called by the Council to discuss the feasibility of establishing an Inshore Lifeboat at Mundesley. It was decided to contact the RNLI and Coastguard to ask for help in setting up a service. Their response was that they would be unable to help due to heavy commitments to other stations in the area.

Independent service
Undiscouraged by this response the Council decided they would set up an independent rescue service. This service would be funded and manned from within the village. As a result of a series of meetings held by the council "The Mundesley Volunteer Inshore Lifeboat Service Ltd" was formed. The organization was to be a Limited Company and registered charity. Being a Limited Company, a board of directors was duly elected who were chosen from a broad section of the local community including proposed crew members. The volunteer crew would take care of the day-to-day running of the boat and the station, whilst the directors would take care of the policy making, fund raising and financial arrangements.

Service commences
By the spring of 1972 the organization was ready to start its service. A Zodiac inflatable was acquired to use as the lifeboat which had been borrowed from a local businessman. This lifeboat was housed in a temporary boathouse on the promenade at the East end of the village. Throughout the summer of 1972 an extensive fund raising campaign was initiated which resulted in the purchase of a 4M Avon Sea Rider semi rigid inflatable which was wholly owned by the new Service. Contractors at the close by Bacton Gas Terminal donated a wooden site hut which was converted into a boathouse.

Stability
Since those early days the Service has gone from strength to strength and has taken part in the rescue of some 100 people in trouble. The lifeboat is called out to service by a pager system which is activated by H M Coastguard from their Great Yarmouth operations room. The lifeboat works closely with other Lifeboat stations in the area both inshore and offshore, and also with the RAF Search and Rescue Helicopter Squadron now located at Wattisham in Suffolk. All the crew members are volunteers who are trained in all aspects of search and rescue work, boat handling, first aid, and navigation. The volunteers undertake training all year round. There are lifeboat crew on duty at the station every Sunday and Bank Holiday during the summer months.

New station
A new Lifeboat station was built in 2006 which was funded entirely by donations received by the public. The new station is a steel-framed building which has block and brick curtain walling. The roof is constructed from insulated steel cladding. The interior consist of a main boat hall in which the boat and the tractor sit side by side ready for service. Also on the ground floor is the drying room which holds all of the crew's personal protection equipment such as drysuits, helmets and lifejackets. This room is constantly kept warm and damp free to prolong the life of the crews valuable kit. The first floor consists of four main rooms. The lookout is situated on the eastern elevation so that almost the whole of the Mundesley guard is visible. Also kept in this room are charts of the coast and two VHF radios so a constant communications can be kept with the boat whilst it is out at sea. A second room, next door is used as a crew training room. In this room the Lifeboat service hold the majority of their meetings. It is also where training sessions, which are held fortnightly on a Monday night, take place. The other two rooms on the first floor are used as the Coxswains office and a Kitchen area.

Lifeboat
She was built by Goodchild Marine of Great Yarmouth and she is a Tornado type, called Footprints. The boat is powered by a  Mercury outboard engine.

See also
 Independent lifeboats (British Isles)

Notes and references

External links
Lifeboat website
Mundesley on Sea Parish Council
Mundesley Guide and Photo Gallery
Mundesley village website

Mundesley
Lifeboat stations in Norfolk
Independent Lifeboat stations